South Gibson County High School is a school in Medina, Tennessee, serving students around Medina and Gibson, Tennessee. It opened in 2009 to accommodate a growing population of students who lived in southern Gibson County, but were zoned to attend Gibson County High School.

In 2019, South Gibson County High School is ranked #76 in Tennessee by U.S. News & World Report.

References

External links

2009 establishments in Tennessee
Educational institutions established in 2009
Education in Gibson County, Tennessee
Public high schools in Tennessee